The 2012–13 season was Newcastle United's 120th season of professional football. They competed in the Premier League for the third consecutive season.

Chronological list of events
23 May 2012: The club announces the signing of attacking midfielder Romain Amalfitano, who will join the club when his contract at Reims expires at the end of June.

1 June 2012: First-team members Alan Smith, Peter Løvenkrands and Danny Guthrie are released by the club. Youngsters Samuel Adjei, Phil Airey, Ryan Donaldson, Stephen Folan, Jeff Henderson, Tamás Kádár, Greg McDermott and Patrick Nzuzi are also released.

18 June 2012: Youngster Dan Taylor joins Oldham Athletic on a free transfer after being released by the club.

18 June 2012: The 2012–13 Premier League fixtures are released at 9:00 am BST.
29 June 2012: Central midfielder Danny Guthrie joins Reading on a three-year contract, after being released by Newcastle a month previously. His contract will become permanent on 1 July. Meanwhile, goalkeeper Fraser Forster signs with Scottish club Celtic for a fee of £2 million.

2 July 2012: Striker Leon Best joins Blackburn Rovers for an undisclosed fee, believed to be in the region of £3 million.

5 July 2012: The first Premier League TV fixtures (August–November) are announced with ESPN choosing Newcastle's first two games, against Tottenham Hotspur and Chelsea. Sky Sports select Newcastle's trips to Everton, Sunderland and Liverpool with the visit of Manchester United also selected.
6 July 2012: The club announces the signing of defensive midfielder Gaël Bigirimana from Coventry City for an undisclosed fee, believed to be in the region of £500,000.

13 July 2012: Newcastle's first pre-season game ends in a 1–0 defeat to German club Chemnitzer FC.
16 July 2012: Demba Ba scores the only goal in a 1–0 win over AS Monaco.
21 July 2012: Mehdi Abeid scores in a 1–1 draw with Fenerbahçe in Austria.
27 July 2012: Newcastle's Guadiana Trophy starts with a 1–1 draw with Olympiacos.
28 July 2012: Goals from Demba Ba and Ryan Taylor give Newcastle a 2–1 win over Braga and win the Guadiana Trophy for Newcastle.
31 July 2012: The club announce the signing of defender Curtis Good from Melbourne Heart on a six-year deal.

4 August 2012: ADO Den Haag hold Newcastle to a goalless draw at the Kyocera Stadium. After the match, Alan Pardew complains to the Dutch side about their fans racially abusing Cheick Tioté, Demba Ba and Papiss Cissé.
10 August 2012: The Europa League play-off draw is made, pairing Newcastle with Greek side Atromitos.
11 August 2012: Newcastle suffer a 4–1 defeat to Cardiff City.
16 August 2012: The club and Ajax announce that a price has been agreed for midfielder Vurnon Anita, subject agreeing personal terms and the player passing a medical.

18 August 2012: A goal from Demba Ba and a Hatem Ben Arfa penalty help Newcastle beat Tottenham 2–1 in their first Premier League game of the 2012–13 season, despite Pardew being sent to the stands after pushing the fourth official claiming the ball went out of play for a Magpies throw-in.
23 August 2012: Ryan Taylor's free-kick earns Newcastle a 1–1 draw against Atromitos in the first leg of their Europa League play-off in Athens.
25 August 2012:  The Magpies suffer a 2–0 defeat to Chelsea at Stamford Bridge thanks to an Eden Hazard penalty and a Fernando Torres strike both in the first half, but Pardew's side are better in the second half.
27 August 2012: The club announce the death of former executive Freddie Fletcher, who worked at St James' Park in the 1990s.
30 August 2012: Haris Vučkić scores his first Newcastle goal in a 1–0 win over Atromitos in the Europa League. The win sees Newcastle qualify for the Europa League group stage.
31 August 2012: The draw for the Europa League group stage sees Pardew's team placed in Group D with Bordeaux, Club Brugge and Marítimo.
2 September 2012: Hatem Ben Arfa's curler gives Newcastle a disappointing draw at home to Aston Villa.
17 September 2012: Demba Ba's double (including Newcastle's 1,000th Premier League goal) gives Newcastle a 2–2 draw at Everton.
20 September 2012: Newcastle start their Europa League group stage campaign with a goalless draw with Portuguese outfit Marítimo on the island of Madeira, despite both sides having good chances throughout the game.
23 September 2012: Demba Ba nets his fourth league goal of the season in a 1–0 home win over Norwich City, despite Papiss Cissé's missed penalty.
26 September 2012: Despite a spirited performance, the Magpies go out the Football League Cup at the first hurdle at Old Trafford with substitutes Shane Ferguson and Cissé combining to net Newcastle's consolation goal in a 2–1 defeat, having both came on at the same time.
29 September 2012: Ba scores a volley and a controversial goal to earn Newcastle a 2–2 draw at Reading.
4 October 2012: Newcastle go top of their Europa League group after thrashing Bordeaux 3–0, with Shola Ameobi and Cissé scoring, whilst Henrique nets an own goal in between.
7 October 2012: Having lost 3–0 at St James' Park last season, Manchester United win by the same score on Tyneside, condemning Pardew's team to a first home defeat of the season. After the game, Pardew asks for action against Ba's golden boot rival Robin van Persie for a deliberate foul on Yohan Cabaye.
8 October 2012: The Football Association decide not to take any action over the foul on Cabaye by Van Persie.
9 October 2012: Short-term loan company Wonga agree a deal to sponsor the Magpies from the 2013–14 season; the deal sees St James' Park renamed having been known as Sports Direct Arena since November 2011.
21 October 2012: After Cabaye opens the scoring in the first Tyne-Wear derby of the season, Cheick Tioté is sent off and, despite a man of the match-winning performance from skipper Fabricio Coloccini, a shock Ba own goal means the game finishes 1–1.
25 October 2012: Gabriel Obertan's first goal at St James' Park helps Newcastle take a giant step towards the Europa League knock-out rounds with a 1–0 win over Belgian Pro League leaders Club Brugge.
28 October 2012: Cissé's goal drought is ended after a 93rd minute shot from Sammy Ameobi is deflected of him and in to the net to give the Magpies victory at home to West Bromwich Albion.
4 November 2012: Newcastle earn another excellent 1–1 draw away with ten men and Cabaye opening the scoring, this time at Anfield, where Luis Suárez's excellent goal gives Liverpool a point; Coloccini is sent off.
8 November 2012: After going 2–0 down inside 20 minutes away to Club Brugge in Belgium, Vurnon Anita's volley and a Shola Ameobi goal, assisted by brother Sammy, earn the Toon Army a 2–2 draw and the result means they take another step towards qualification.
11 November 2012: Former Newcastle captain Kevin Nolan's goal gives West Ham United a shock 1–0 win at St James' Park. Another former player, Rob Elliot, returns from his bike ride across Europe for the Bobby Robson Foundation.
17 November 2012: Two errors from goalkeeper Tim Krul gives Swansea City a 2–1 win at St James' Park after another poor performance by the tynesiders.
22 November 2012: A 1–1 draw with Marítimo secures Newcastle a place in the knockout phase of the Europa League.
25 November 2012: A terrible performance sees Newcastle lose 2–0 at Southampton.
28 November 2012: Newcastle lose a 1–0 lead to Stoke City, by whom they were eventually defeated 2–1, the club's fourth consecutive defeat. This is their worst start to a Premier League season since their 2008–09 campaign in which they were ultimately relegated to the Championship.
3 December 2012: An awful run of form is ended in a fantastic night at home to Wigan Athletic. A Demba Ba double and Gaël Bigirimana's first goal for the club result in a 3–0 victory against the Lancashire outfit, who had Maynor Figueroa sent off for a foul which resulted in a penalty Ba scored for the first of the night.
6 December 2012: Cheick Diabaté's double means Newcastle lose their final Europa League group game and miss out on the chance to finish top of Group D.
10 December 2012: Despite Newcastle's improved performances continuing, they lose 2–1 at Fulham.
15 December 2012: Alan Pardew's side are left 15th after losing 3–1 at home to Manchester City despite another brave performance.
17 December 2012: Pardew cancels Newcastle's Christmas party, claiming the team have not been good enough over the season and calls it a mark of respect to the fans.
22 December 2012: Substitute Shola Ameobi scores an 81st-minute winner to give Newcastle a precious win over Queens Park Rangers, taking the Magpies up to 14th in the league table.
26 December 2012: Newcastle are so close to giving their fans a Christmas present having taken the lead three times against Manchester United at Old Trafford through James Perch, a Jonny Evans own goal and a Papiss Cissé strike, but they lose 4–3 after Javier Hernández's late winner.
29 December 2012: After going behind three times and drawing level every time, a tiring Newcastle are beaten 7–3 at Arsenal thanks to a Theo Walcott hat-trick despite a Demba Ba double and Sylvain Marveaux's first Premier League goal.
31 December 2012: Newcastle and French side Lille agree a fee of £5.5 million for defender Mathieu Debuchy, after the 4–3 loss to Manchester United and 7–3 defeat to Arsenal exposed the gaps in the Magpies' defence.
2 January 2013: Despite Papiss Cissé opening the scoring in the second minute, Newcastle suffer their ninth defeat in 11 games with a 2–1 loss to Everton, further exposing the gaps in the Magpies' defence.
4 January 2013: Demba Ba is signed by Chelsea after the club triggered the £7 million release clause in the striker's contract. Newcastle also officially announce the signing of Debuchy from Lille for a fee of £5.5 million.
5 January 2013: A poor performance knocks Alan Pardew's team out the FA Cup at Championship side Brighton & Hove Albion, with Shola Ameobi sent off.
12 January 2013: A superb defensive display helps the Newcastle to grab a point at Norwich City in a stalemate.
19 January 2013: Defensive normality is resumed at home to struggling Reading as Adam Le Fondre's double gives the Royals their first win on Tyneside after Yohan Cabaye's 35th-minute free-kick. Pardew walks off to a chorus of boos after a poor managerial performance.
22–25 January 2013: Newcastle make four more new signings, all from France's Ligue 1. These were French internationals Mapou Yanga-Mbiwa and Moussa Sissoko from Montpellier and Toulouse respectively, as well as Yoan Gouffran from Bordeaux and Massadio Haïdara from Nancy.
29 January 2013: A hard-fought 2–1 win against Aston Villa pull Newcastle four points clear of the relegation zone.
2 February 2013: The Magpies record their first home win over Chelsea since 2006, with a dominant 3–2 win over the Blues, including two goals from new signing Moussa Sissoko. With the win, Newcastle further extended their distance from the drop zone, sitting six points ahead of 18th placed Wigan.
9 February 2013: Newcastle drop back to 16th despite a brave display in a 2–1 loss at Tottenham Hotspur. Yoan Gouffran's first goal for the club sees the visitors level at half-time but a Gareth Bale double results in a 2–1 home win.
14 February 2013: Papiss Cissé has two goals controversially ruled out, both for offside, as the Magpies are held to a 0–0 draw at home to Metalist Kharkiv.
20 February 2013: The club confirm a French Day for their home match with Southampton after signing five Frenchmen in January (Debuchy, Gouffran, Sissoko, Haïdara and Yanga-Mbiwa) to add to Romain Amalfitano, Sylvain Marveaux, Yohan Cabaye, Hatem Ben Arfa and Gabriel Obertan.
21 February 2013: Shola Ameobi scores his 15th European goal from the penalty spot as Newcastle beat Metalist Kharkiv 1–0 for their first European away win since February 2007 to seal a tie with Russian giants Anzhi Makhachkala, but man of the match Tim Krul suffers an injury keeping him out until early April.
24 February 2013: On French Day, the Magpies beat Southampton 4–2, taking the club above the Saints and local rivals Sunderland just four weeks after being seven points behind the Black Cats. There are three French speaking players who score — Morgan Schneiderlin to put the visitors in front after just three minutes; Moussa Sissoko with a tap-in to equalize, having been set up by another Frenchman, Yoan Gouffran; and Yohan Cabaye, who netted a penalty to make it 3–2 to Newcastle. Another French-speaking player, Papiss Cissé, scores a wonder strike to make it 2–1 to the hosts. Rickie Lambert netted a tap-in to put Southampton level, but a Jos Hooiveld own goal gives Newcastle a 4–2 lead.
1 March 2013: Nile Ranger leaves the club by mutual consent, having had running battles with fans on Twitter and was arrested in January after criticizing fans for booing following the poor performance in the home defeat to Reading.
2 March 2013: Newcastle drop back down to 15th after a 1–0 loss at League Cup winners Swansea despite an excellent performance by Steven Taylor and the fact the Magpies were the better team in the second half before Luke Moore's 85th-minute winner.
7 March 2013: An excellent defensive display helps Newcastle to become the first team to deny Anzhi Makhachkala victory on home soil in the Europa League.
10 March 2013: For the third Premier League home game in a row, the Magpies come from behind to win, this time against Stoke. Jonathan Walters put the Potters 1–0 up from the penalty spot before a Yohan Cabaye free-kick and an injury time volley from Cissé win the game for Newcastle.
14 March 2013: In the second leg of the Europa League round of 16 tie with Anzhi, the visitors go down to ten men after Mehdi Carcela's 55th-minute red card. The game looked to be heading into extra time until Cissé's last-second header.
15 March 2013: Newcastle are the last team to be drawn out for the Europa League quarter-finals and are paired with unbeaten runaway Portuguese Primeira Liga leaders Benfica
17 March 2013: In a controversial encounter at struggling Wigan, the Magpies went behind to Jean Beausejour's first goal for the home side before Callum McManaman's horror challenge on Massadio Haïdara went controversially unpunished, meaning Pardew's number two John Carver and Latics first team coach Graham Barrow both sent to the stands for the second half for a spat. David Santon's first Newcastle goal looked to have saved them a point, but after Cissé's shot was saved by goalkeeper Joel before a goal kick was given, TV replays showed that Maynor Figueroa handled the ball before Arouna Koné's eventual winner.
19 March 2013: Steven Taylor earns himself an England call up to replace the injured Gary Cahill, but on the same day the FA decide not to take action against Callum McManaman following his horror challenge on Massadio Haïdara, much to the anger of the Magpies.
21 March 2013: Newcastle's longest-serving player, Steve Harper, announces his retirement after 20 years with the Tynesiders
30 March 2013: Alan Pardew's injury-hit side are thrashed 4–0 by a brilliant Manchester City side, dropping the Magpies down to 15th.
4 April 2013: After Cissé gives the Magpies a priceless lead away to the Primeira Liga unbeaten leaders Benfica in the 1st leg of the Europa League goals from Rodrigo, Lima and Óscar Cardozo kill off a brave Magpies side.
7 April 2013: Cissé scores yet another late winner at home to Fulham. The goal saw Alan Pardew do a famous touchline dash, a celebration that Real Madrid manager José Mourinho has done on numerous occasions; Pardew ended up celebrating in the crowd.
11 April 2013: Cissé's 71st-minute header gives Newcastle hope of progressing into the Europa League semi-finals against Benfica before Eduardo Salvio's late equalizer sends Pardew's team out of Europe.
14 April 2013: Newcastle suffer an embarrassing 3–0 home defeat to local rivals Sunderland in the Tyne–Wear derby, the Black Cats' first win since 19 January. After the match, fans start riots in Newcastle, with 29 people arrested.
15 April 2013: The Magpies release a statement saying they were appalled with the riots and will give lifetime bans to fans found guilty.
20 April 2013: Newcastle drop down to 16th on goal difference despite an excellent 1–1 draw at West Brom, with Yoan Gouffran's second goal for the club.
27 April 2013: The Magpies suffer yet another embarrassing home defeat losing 6–0 to Liverpool despite their star striker Luis Suárez being suspended for the game after another awful display from Pardew's side.
1 May 2013: The club release a statement saying they are disappointed about The Suns untrue article about Hatem Ben Arfa.
4 May 2013: Newcastle take another away beat, this time a 0–0 draw at West Ham despite Cissé having a shot which may have gone in cleared off the line by Winston Reid. After the match, Pardew responded to The Suns article about Ben Arfa.
9 May 2013: The Journal report that Steve Harper may have to wait until the following season for his testimonial and they mention it might be against Rangers.
10 May 2013: Moussa Sissoko and Shola Ameobi are both ruled out for the rest of the season.
12 May 2013: Newcastle's survival is mathematically confirmed with a 2–1 win at already-relegated Queens Park Rangers. Loïc Rémy, who almost moved to the Magpies, opened the scoring from the penalty spot for QPR before Ben Arfa equalized from another penalty. Gouffran then benefited from QPR keeper Robert Green's poor clearance to put the Magpies in front. Rob Elliot's red card late on meant Steve Harper could come on, it also meant he would be able to play his last match against Arsenal.
19 May 2013: Newcastle's last match of the season, at home to Arsenal, sees the Gunners win 1–0 through Laurent Koscielny's volley and confirm their Champions League spot for next season. The defeat sees Alan Pardew's team drop to 16th, though they had the consolation of finishing above local rivals Sunderland. In the 37th minute, the fans do a minute's applause for retiring goalkeeper Steve Harper.

Club

Team kit
Puma supplied the team kits. The new Home kit was debuted on 13 July during a pre-season friendly against German Third Division side Chemnitzer FC, and went on sale on 1 August, as did the third kit. The shirt sponsor was Virgin Money.

Coaching staff

Statistics

Appearances and goals
Last updated on 19 May 2013.

Top scorers

Cards
Accounts for all competitions. Last updated on 19 May 2013.

Players

First team squad

Reserves
The following players did not appear for the first team this season.

Youth team
The following players made most of their appearances for the youth team this season, but may have appeared for the reserves.

Transfers

In

 Total spending:  ~ £25,900,000

Out

 Total income:  ~ £12,000,000

Loans out

Competitions

Overall

Pre-season

Guadiana Trophy

Premier League

League table

Results summary

Results by round

Premier League

FA Cup

Football League Cup

UEFA Europa League

Play-off round

Group stage

Knockout phase

Round of 32

Round of 16

Quarter-finals

References

2012-13
2012–13 Premier League by team
2012–13 UEFA Europa League participants seasons